The 2005–06 Phoenix Coyotes season, was the franchise's 34th season overall, 27th season in the National Hockey League and tenth season in Phoenix. Retired player Wayne Gretzky was named coach. The Coyotes missed the playoffs for the third consecutive year.

Offseason
Key dates prior to the start of the season:
 The 2005 NHL Entry Draft took place in Ottawa, Ontario, Canada on July 30, 2005.
 The free agency period began on August 1.

 On August 6, 2004, Brett Hull, son of former Jet Bobby Hull, was signed. After wearing his customary number 16 during the preseason and the first two games of the regular season, he was re-assigned the elder Hull's retired number 9.
 August 8, 2005 – The Coyotes introduced Gretzky as its new head coach, replacing Rick Bowness, despite the fact that he had never coached at any level of hockey. The Coyotes Ring of Honor was unveiled on 8 October, inducting Gretzky and Bobby Hull.  One week later, Brett Hull announced his retirement.  On 21 January 2006, Jets great Thomas Steen was the third inductee to the Ring of Honor.  On 13 April, Steve Ellman announced an agreement for Jerry Moyes to assume majority ownership control of the Coyotes, Glendale Arena and the National Lacrosse League's Arizona Sting.

Wayne Gretzky
Despite previous denials that Wayne Gretzky would not assume coaching duties, on August 8, 2005 Gretzky agreed to become the new coach of the Coyotes.

In the time leading up to Gretzky's announcement, several prominent free agents signed with Phoenix citing the chance to play for Gretzky, including Brett Hull. Hull, who was briefly Gretzky's right winger, only lasted five games and only scored one assist before retiring. Ironically, "The Golden Brett" would have had the record for the most goals over any given three seasons — he scored 228 goals between 1989–90 and 1991–92 — if it weren't for The Great One. From 1981–82 to 1983–84, Gretzky scored 254 goals.

Gretzky made his coaching debut on October 5, 2005, the opening night of the 2005–06 NHL season, losing 3–2 to the Vancouver Canucks. His first coaching victory was October 8, 2005, beating the Minnesota Wild 2–1. Gretzky took an indefinite leave of absence as coach on December 17, 2005 to care for his ill mother in Brantford, Ontario. His mother lost her battle to lung cancer two days later, dying on December 19, 2005. Assistant coach Rick Tocchet assumed the position until Gretzky's return on December 28. Coyotes' CEO Jeff Shumway announced on June 5, 2006 that Gretzky has agreed to a new five-year contract to remain as head coach.

Regular season
Also in the 2005–06 season, the Coyotes were planning to host the NHL all-star game. Due to the XX Winter Olympic Games, the game was canceled. Wayne Gretzky was the General Manager of the Canadian Olympic Hockey Team. Coyotes captain Shane Doan was selected for the Canadian team.

The Coyotes tied the Los Angeles Kings for most power-play opportunities, with 541.

Final standings

Schedule and results

|- align="center" bgcolor="#FFBBBB"
|1||L||October 5, 2005||2–3 || align="left"| @ Vancouver Canucks (2005–06) ||0–1–0 || 
|- align="center" bgcolor="#FFBBBB"
|2||L||October 6, 2005||2–3 || align="left"| @ Los Angeles Kings (2005–06) ||0–2–0 || 
|- align="center" bgcolor="#CCFFCC"
|3||W||October 8, 2005||2–1 || align="left"|  Minnesota Wild (2005–06) ||1–2–0 || 
|- align="center" bgcolor="#FFBBBB"
|4||L||October 11, 2005||2–3 || align="left"| @ Dallas Stars (2005–06) ||1–3–0 || 
|- align="center"
|5||L||October 13, 2005||4–5 SO|| align="left"|  Nashville Predators (2005–06) ||1–3–1 || 
|- align="center" bgcolor="#FFBBBB"
|6||L||October 15, 2005||0–2 || align="left"|  Detroit Red Wings (2005–06) ||1–4–1 || 
|- align="center" bgcolor="#CCFFCC"
|7||W||October 17, 2005||2–0 || align="left"| @ Calgary Flames (2005–06) ||2–4–1 || 
|- align="center" bgcolor="#CCFFCC"
|8||W||October 18, 2005||4–3 OT|| align="left"| @ Edmonton Oilers (2005–06) ||3–4–1 || 
|- align="center" bgcolor="#FFBBBB"
|9||L||October 20, 2005||2–3 || align="left"| @ Vancouver Canucks (2005–06) ||3–5–1 || 
|- align="center" bgcolor="#FFBBBB"
|10||L||October 23, 2005||3–5 || align="left"| @ Mighty Ducks of Anaheim (2005–06) ||3–6–1 || 
|- align="center" bgcolor="#CCFFCC"
|11||W||October 25, 2005||5–4 OT|| align="left"|  St. Louis Blues (2005–06) ||4–6–1 || 
|- align="center" bgcolor="#CCFFCC"
|12||W||October 27, 2005||3–2 || align="left"|  Calgary Flames (2005–06) ||5–6–1 || 
|- align="center" bgcolor="#FFBBBB"
|13||L||October 29, 2005||3–5 || align="left"|  Dallas Stars (2005–06) ||5–7–1 || 
|- align="center" bgcolor="#FFBBBB"
|14||L||October 30, 2005||2–3 || align="left"| @ Mighty Ducks of Anaheim (2005–06) ||5–8–1 || 
|-

|- align="center" bgcolor="#CCFFCC"
|15||W||November 3, 2005||4–0 || align="left"|  Los Angeles Kings (2005–06) ||6–8–1 || 
|- align="center" bgcolor="#CCFFCC"
|16||W||November 5, 2005||4–1 || align="left"| @ Detroit Red Wings (2005–06) ||7–8–1 || 
|- align="center"
|17||L||November 6, 2005||1–2 OT|| align="left"| @ Chicago Blackhawks (2005–06) ||7–8–2 || 
|- align="center" bgcolor="#CCFFCC"
|18||W||November 8, 2005||4–2 || align="left"| @ Minnesota Wild (2005–06) ||8–8–2 || 
|- align="center" bgcolor="#FFBBBB"
|19||L||November 10, 2005||3–4 || align="left"|  Calgary Flames (2005–06) ||8–9–2 || 
|- align="center" bgcolor="#CCFFCC"
|20||W||November 12, 2005||2–1 OT|| align="left"|  Mighty Ducks of Anaheim (2005–06) ||9–9–2 || 
|- align="center" bgcolor="#FFBBBB"
|21||L||November 16, 2005||1–3 || align="left"|  Colorado Avalanche (2005–06) ||9–10–2 || 
|- align="center" bgcolor="#CCFFCC"
|22||W||November 19, 2005||4–3 SO|| align="left"| @ San Jose Sharks (2005–06) ||10–10–2 || 
|- align="center" bgcolor="#CCFFCC"
|23||W||November 20, 2005||5–1 || align="left"|  Columbus Blue Jackets (2005–06) ||11–10–2 || 
|- align="center" bgcolor="#FFBBBB"
|24||L||November 22, 2005||1–2 || align="left"|  Mighty Ducks of Anaheim (2005–06) ||11–11–2 || 
|- align="center" bgcolor="#CCFFCC"
|25||W||November 25, 2005||4–1 || align="left"| @ Dallas Stars (2005–06) ||12–11–2 || 
|- align="center" bgcolor="#CCFFCC"
|26||W||November 26, 2005||2–1 || align="left"|  Vancouver Canucks (2005–06) ||13–11–2 || 
|- align="center" bgcolor="#FFBBBB"
|27||L||November 30, 2005||1–6 || align="left"| @ Mighty Ducks of Anaheim (2005–06) ||13–12–2 || 
|-

|- align="center" bgcolor="#CCFFCC"
|28||W||December 3, 2005||8–4 || align="left"|  Carolina Hurricanes (2005–06) ||14–12–2 || 
|- align="center" bgcolor="#CCFFCC"
|29||W||December 5, 2005||5–2 || align="left"|  Atlanta Thrashers (2005–06) ||15–12–2 || 
|- align="center" bgcolor="#CCFFCC"
|30||W||December 11, 2005||2–1 OT|| align="left"| @ Boston Bruins (2005–06) ||16–12–2 || 
|- align="center" bgcolor="#FFBBBB"
|31||L||December 13, 2005||2–5 || align="left"| @ Montreal Canadiens (2005–06) ||16–13–2 || 
|- align="center" bgcolor="#FFBBBB"
|32||L||December 15, 2005||1–3 || align="left"|  Tampa Bay Lightning (2005–06) ||16–14–2 || 
|- align="center" bgcolor="#FFBBBB"
|33||L||December 17, 2005||1–4 || align="left"| @ Los Angeles Kings (2005–06) ||16–15–2 || 
|- align="center" bgcolor="#FFBBBB"
|34||L||December 20, 2005||4–5 || align="left"|  St. Louis Blues (2005–06) ||16–16–2 || 
|- align="center" bgcolor="#CCFFCC"
|35||W||December 22, 2005||2–1 || align="left"|  San Jose Sharks (2005–06) ||17–16–2 || 
|- align="center" bgcolor="#CCFFCC"
|36||W||December 23, 2005||3–2 || align="left"| @ Dallas Stars (2005–06) ||18–16–2 || 
|- align="center" bgcolor="#FFBBBB"
|37||L||December 26, 2005||4–7 || align="left"| @ Colorado Avalanche (2005–06) ||18–17–2 || 
|- align="center" bgcolor="#CCFFCC"
|38||W||December 28, 2005||5–4 || align="left"| @ San Jose Sharks (2005–06) ||19–17–2 || 
|- align="center" bgcolor="#CCFFCC"
|39||W||December 29, 2005||6–5 OT|| align="left"|  Los Angeles Kings (2005–06) ||20–17–2 || 
|- align="center" bgcolor="#FFBBBB"
|40||L||December 31, 2005||2–5 || align="left"|  Colorado Avalanche (2005–06) ||20–18–2 || 
|-

|- align="center" bgcolor="#FFBBBB"
|41||L||January 5, 2006||0–4 || align="left"| @ Los Angeles Kings (2005–06) ||20–19–2 || 
|- align="center" bgcolor="#FFBBBB"
|42||L||January 8, 2006||2–5 || align="left"|  Columbus Blue Jackets (2005–06) ||20–20–2 || 
|- align="center" bgcolor="#FFBBBB"
|43||L||January 10, 2006||2–7 || align="left"| @ Ottawa Senators (2005–06) ||20–21–2 || 
|- align="center" bgcolor="#CCFFCC"
|44||W||January 12, 2006||2–1 SO|| align="left"| @ Buffalo Sabres (2005–06) ||21–21–2 || 
|- align="center" bgcolor="#CCFFCC"
|45||W||January 14, 2006||4–3 || align="left"| @ Toronto Maple Leafs (2005–06) ||22–21–2 || 
|- align="center" bgcolor="#FFBBBB"
|46||L||January 16, 2006||1–6 || align="left"|  Washington Capitals (2005–06) ||22–22–2 || 
|- align="center" bgcolor="#CCFFCC"
|47||W||January 19, 2006||6–3 || align="left"|  Florida Panthers (2005–06) ||23–22–2 || 
|- align="center" bgcolor="#CCFFCC"
|48||W||January 21, 2006||4–3 SO|| align="left"|  Edmonton Oilers (2005–06) ||24–22–2 || 
|- align="center" bgcolor="#FFBBBB"
|49||L||January 23, 2006||1–4 || align="left"| @ Dallas Stars (2005–06) ||24–23–2 || 
|- align="center" bgcolor="#FFBBBB"
|50||L||January 24, 2006||2–3 || align="left"| @ Minnesota Wild (2005–06) ||24–24–2 || 
|- align="center" bgcolor="#CCFFCC"
|51||W||January 26, 2006||5–3 || align="left"| @ St. Louis Blues (2005–06) ||25–24–2 || 
|- align="center" bgcolor="#CCFFCC"
|52||W||January 28, 2006||6–2 || align="left"|  San Jose Sharks (2005–06) ||26–24–2 || 
|- align="center"
|53||L||January 29, 2006||3–4 SO|| align="left"|  Edmonton Oilers (2005–06) ||26–24–3 || 
|- align="center" bgcolor="#FFBBBB"
|54||L||January 31, 2006||4–7 || align="left"|  Vancouver Canucks (2005–06) ||26–25–3 || 
|-

|- align="center" bgcolor="#CCFFCC"
|55||W||February 2, 2006||2–1 SO|| align="left"|  Los Angeles Kings (2005–06) ||27–25–3 || 
|- align="center" bgcolor="#FFBBBB"
|56||L||February 4, 2006||4–6 || align="left"|  Minnesota Wild (2005–06) ||27–26–3 || 
|- align="center" bgcolor="#FFBBBB"
|57||L||February 7, 2006||1–3 || align="left"|  Chicago Blackhawks (2005–06) ||27–27–3 || 
|- align="center" bgcolor="#FFBBBB"
|58||L||February 9, 2006||1–5 || align="left"|  Dallas Stars (2005–06) ||27–28–3 || 
|- align="center"
|59||L||February 12, 2006||4–5 OT|| align="left"|  San Jose Sharks (2005–06) ||27–28–4 || 
|-

|- align="center" bgcolor="#CCFFCC"
|60||W||March 2, 2006||6–2 || align="left"|  Dallas Stars (2005–06) ||28–28–4 || 
|- align="center" bgcolor="#FFBBBB"
|61||L||March 4, 2006||3–7 || align="left"|  Detroit Red Wings (2005–06) ||28–29–4 || 
|- align="center" bgcolor="#CCFFCC"
|62||W||March 7, 2006||5–2 || align="left"| @ Detroit Red Wings (2005–06) ||29–29–4 || 
|- align="center" bgcolor="#FFBBBB"
|63||L||March 9, 2006||4–5 || align="left"| @ Columbus Blue Jackets (2005–06) ||29–30–4 || 
|- align="center" bgcolor="#FFBBBB"
|64||L||March 11, 2006||3–5 || align="left"|  Mighty Ducks of Anaheim (2005–06) ||29–31–4 || 
|- align="center" bgcolor="#FFBBBB"
|65||L||March 12, 2006||2–5 || align="left"| @ Mighty Ducks of Anaheim (2005–06) ||29–32–4 || 
|- align="center" bgcolor="#CCFFCC"
|66||W||March 14, 2006||6–2 || align="left"| @ Los Angeles Kings (2005–06) ||30–32–4 || 
|- align="center" bgcolor="#FFBBBB"
|67||L||March 16, 2006||0–2 || align="left"| @ Nashville Predators (2005–06) ||30–33–4 || 
|- align="center" bgcolor="#CCFFCC"
|68||W||March 19, 2006||3–2 || align="left"| @ Chicago Blackhawks (2005–06) ||31–33–4 || 
|- align="center" bgcolor="#CCFFCC"
|69||W||March 21, 2006||5–2 || align="left"| @ Columbus Blue Jackets (2005–06) ||32–33–4 || 
|- align="center" bgcolor="#CCFFCC"
|70||W||March 23, 2006||4–3 || align="left"|  Chicago Blackhawks (2005–06) ||33–33–4 || 
|- align="center" bgcolor="#FFBBBB"
|71||L||March 25, 2006||2–5 || align="left"|  Mighty Ducks of Anaheim (2005–06) ||33–34–4 || 
|- align="center" bgcolor="#CCFFCC"
|72||W||March 28, 2006||5–3 || align="left"|  Nashville Predators (2005–06) ||34–34–4 || 
|- align="center" bgcolor="#CCFFCC"
|73||W||March 30, 2006||5–2 || align="left"| @ San Jose Sharks (2005–06) ||35–34–4 || 
|-

|- align="center" bgcolor="#CCFFCC"
|74||W||April 1, 2006||4–3 OT|| align="left"| @ San Jose Sharks (2005–06) ||36–34–4 || 
|- align="center" bgcolor="#FFBBBB"
|75||L||April 3, 2006||1–7 || align="left"| @ Edmonton Oilers (2005–06) ||36–35–4 || 
|- align="center" bgcolor="#FFBBBB"
|76||L||April 5, 2006||2–5 || align="left"| @ Calgary Flames (2005–06) ||36–36–4 || 
|- align="center"
|77||L||April 8, 2006||2–3 SO|| align="left"|  Dallas Stars (2005–06) ||36–36–5 || 
|- align="center" bgcolor="#FFBBBB"
|78||L||April 10, 2006||2–3 || align="left"|  San Jose Sharks (2005–06) ||36–37–5 || 
|- align="center" bgcolor="#FFBBBB"
|79||L||April 11, 2006||4–6 || align="left"| @ Colorado Avalanche (2005–06) ||36–38–5 || 
|- align="center" bgcolor="#CCFFCC"
|80||W||April 13, 2006||3–0 || align="left"|  Los Angeles Kings (2005–06) ||37–38–5 || 
|- align="center" bgcolor="#FFBBBB"
|81||L||April 15, 2006||1–5 || align="left"| @ Nashville Predators (2005–06) ||37–39–5 || 
|- align="center" bgcolor="#CCFFCC"
|82||W||April 16, 2006||3–0 || align="left"| @ St. Louis Blues (2005–06) ||38–39–5 || 
|-

|-
| Legend:

Player statistics

Scoring
 Position abbreviations: C = Center; D = Defense; G = Goaltender; LW = Left Wing; RW = Right Wing
  = Joined team via a transaction (e.g., trade, waivers, signing) during the season. Stats reflect time with the Coyotes only.
  = Left team via a transaction (e.g., trade, waivers, release) during the season. Stats reflect time with the Coyotes only.

Goaltending
  = Joined team via a transaction (e.g., trade, waivers, signing) during the season. Stats reflect time with the Coyotes only.
  = Left team via a transaction (e.g., trade, waivers, release) during the season. Stats reflect time with the Coyotes only.

Awards and records

Awards

Milestones

Transactions
The Coyotes were involved in the following transactions from February 17, 2005, the day after the 2004–05 NHL season was officially cancelled, through June 19, 2006, the day of the deciding game of the 2006 Stanley Cup Finals.

Trades

Players acquired

Players lost

Signings

Draft picks
Phoenix's draft picks at the 2005 NHL Entry Draft held at the Westin Hotel in Ottawa, Ontario.

Farm teams
 San Antonio Rampage, American Hockey League

Notes

References

Pho
Pho
Arizona Coyotes seasons